The Trans European Services for Telematics between Administrations (TESTA) system is the private IP-based network of the European Union. TESTA is a telecommunications interconnection platform for secure information exchange between the European and member states administrations. It is currently handled within the ISA² European programme.

TESTA is not a single network, but a network of networks, composed of the EuroDomain backbone and Local Domain networks. The EuroDomain is a European backbone network for administrative data exchanges acting as a network communication platform between local administrations.

History 

The TESTA network has been upgraded several times, with added features through the years:

 1st generation (TESTA): 1996–2000
 2nd generation (TESTA-II): 2000–2006
 3rd generation (sTESTA): 2006–2013
 4th generation (TESTA-NG): since 2013

See also
 European Network and Information Security Agency
 EUDRANET

External links
TESTA official web page
sTESTA overview

References 

European Union
Information technology organizations based in Europe